Thaikkudam Bridge is a Kerala-based multi-genre music band, founded and formed in 2013 by Govind Vasantha and Siddharth Menon. The band first became famous through the musical show Music Mojo, which used to telecast on Kappa TV and with their own composition "Fish Rock", which became popular through social networking sites and YouTube.  

According to sources within the band, the band literally had its inception near Thaikkudam Bridge at Thaikkudam, Kochi, in early 2013. Since then, the  band has gone on to win numerous awards, perform at over 400 venues and released their own album.

Band Members
The Band consists of musicians from all over India who contribute their own style and influences to the ensemble.

Musicians 
 Peethambaran Menon - Vocalist
 Govind Vasantha - Vocalist, Violinist, Music Producer & Founder
 Mithun Raju - Lead Guitarist
 Anish TN - Drummer
 Ashok Betty Nelson - Rhythm Guitarist
 Vian Fernandes - Bass, Vocals
 Ruthin Thej - Keyboard
 Anish Krishna - Vocalist
 Krishna Bongane - Vocalist
 Nila Madhav Mohapatra - Vocalist
 Vipin Lal - Vocalist
 Christin Jose - Vocalist

Sound Engineers 
 Amith Bal Kenath
Rajan K.S
Hemanth K

Management 
Thaikkudam Bridge is exclusively managed by Cochin-based creative entity, Wonderwall Media Pvt. Ltd.

Managers 

 Sujith Unnithan
 Vipin Vishnu Nair Badlapur

Discography

Original songs 
 "Fish Rock"
 "Shiva - Navarasam"
 "One - Navarasam"
 "Aarachar - Navarasam"
 "Chathe - Navarasam"
 "Urumbu - Navarasam"
 "Viduthalai - Navarasm"
 "Jai Hanuman - Navarasam"
 "Sultan - Navarasam"
 "Khwaab - Navarasam"
 "Navarasam - Navarasam"

Music Mojo performances 
 "Nostalgia" 
 "Nostalgia 2" 
 "Malayalam Medley"
 "Ilayaraja Medley"
 "Haq Allah"(Music Mojo Season 3) 
 "Jam"
 "Aisa Koi"
 "Rahman Medley"
 "Beat it"
 "Aerials"
 "Thekkum Kooradiyathil"- remixed version of song from Ashwamedham
 "Chekele"
 "Appozhum"
 "Godfather & Co"
 "Neeraduvan"- remixed version of song from Nakhashathangal
 "Nothing Else Matters"
 "Khwaja"
 "Inteha  Roadhouse blues"
 "Livin' La Vida Loca"
 "Taarangal"
 "Thenpandi cheemaiyile"
 "Tribute for Johnson"
 "Khel Mandala"

Concerts 
 Autumn Muse (2014), St. John's Medical College, Bangalore
 The Band Performed during Pearl, 2016 at BITS Pilani Hyderabad Campus, Hyderabad
 The band's first ever North American trip started on Sept 23,  2016 by Thaikkudam Bridge Live Concert in Hartford Connecticut

The Kantara Controversy 
The Kannada Movie,  Kantara (film)  (released in 2022) has a track Varaha Roopam   Kantara (soundtrack)  , which garnered a lot of publicity and popularity for its compelling music, visuals, and folk fusion. Social media posts started noticing and pointing out this track bore a strong resemblance to Thaikkudam Bridge's track  Navarasam (released about 6 years earlier, likely around 2016).  

Comments by fans and critics referred to not only the musical similarity, but also to themes and elements in Thaikudam's music video, which seemed central to the plot and concepts in Kantara. The film-makers of Kantara had not given any creative attribution or citation to the original work from Thaikkudam Bridge, inspite of the close parallels (in both music, and plot theme), and potential copyright issues.  To quote one of the band members   "“Initially, we were okay with it as some songs do have similarities at times. However, the comments, messages and calls didn’t stop. In fact, thousands of comments were deleted on Varaha Roopam’s video. We still gave it time, listened to it a number of times and made sure of the similarities.”" 

The Indie band, in spite of its limited resources, went to court against the media giant  Hombale Films  (creator of Kantara) , causing a temporary take-down of the Kantara video in question, but Kantara's team seems to have prevailed on the legal front, and has gone forward without making any creative attribution .

References

External links
 

Indian rock music groups
Musical groups established in 2013
Music bands from Kerala
2013 establishments in Kerala